Francis Marion Wilhoit (April 24, 1920 – June 9, 2010) was an American political scientist and author, who was the Thomas F. Sheehan Professor of Political Science at Drake University.

Early life and education
Wilhoit was born in 1920 in North Carolina. He attended Harvard University, where he earned a bachelor's degree, a master in public affairs, and a PhD in Political Science. He was friends with Henry Kissinger and Zbigniew Brzezinski in college.

Career
Wilhoit worked in military intelligence, as a cryptographer for the United States Army Air Forces during World War II prior to going to college. He also worked for the Central Intelligence Agency (CIA).

Wilhoit taught in Georgia and Florida. He joined the faculty in the department of Political Science at Drake University in Iowa in 1961. He was Thomas F. Sheehan Professor from 1981 to 1985, and he retired in 1990. He authored several books.

Wilhoit was vocal in his opposition to racism. In 1967, he spoke about the history of slavery as part of the Progressive Young Negro Enterprises's Negro Heritage Series. One of his books was about massive resistance in the Southern United States. Wilhoit was awarded the 1973 Chastain Prize for it. In 1976, he exposed the hypocrisy of a Christian pastor in Texas who denounced the publication of Playboy but had supported Jim Crow laws decades earlier.

Wilhoit's law
The quotation  is often incorrectly attributed to the political scientist Francis M. Wilhoit, who died in 2010. However it was actually written in 2018 by a different man of the name Frank Wilhoit. The composer wrote it as part of a comment in the Crooked Timber blog.

Personal life and death
Wilhoit lived alone, and was an opera aficionado.
He died on June 9, 2010 in Carthage, North Carolina, at age 90.

Selected works

References

1920 births
2010 deaths
People from North Carolina
Harvard Graduate School of Arts and Sciences alumni
Drake University faculty
American political scientists
People of the Central Intelligence Agency
American cryptographers
United States Army Air Forces personnel of World War II
Harvard Kennedy School alumni